Spinoctenus is a genus of wandering spiders first described by N. A. Hazzi, D. Polotow, Antônio Domingos Brescovit, R. González-Obando & M. Simó in 2018.

Species
 it contains eleven species:
Spinoctenus chocoensis Hazzi, Polotow, Brescovit, González-Obando & Simó, 2018 — Colombia
Spinoctenus eberhardi Hazzi, Polotow, Brescovit, González-Obando & Simó, 2018 — Colombia
Spinoctenus escalerete Hazzi, Polotow, Brescovit, González-Obando & Simó, 2018 — Colombia
Spinoctenus flammigerus Hazzi, Polotow, Brescovit, González-Obando & Simó, 2018 — Colombia
Spinoctenus florezi Hazzi, Polotow, Brescovit, González-Obando & Simó, 2018 — Colombia
Spinoctenus nambi Hazzi, Polotow, Brescovit, González-Obando & Simó, 2018 — Colombia
Spinoctenus pericos Hazzi, Polotow, Brescovit, González-Obando & Simó, 2018 — Colombia
Spinoctenus spinosus Hazzi, Polotow, Brescovit, González-Obando & Simó, 2018 — Colombia
Spinoctenus stephaniae Hazzi, Polotow, Brescovit, González-Obando & Simó, 2018 — Colombia
Spinoctenus tequendama Hazzi, Polotow, Brescovit, González-Obando & Simó, 2018 — Colombia
Spinoctenus yotoco Hazzi, Polotow, Brescovit, González-Obando & Simó, 2018 — Colombia

References

External links

Araneomorphae genera
Ctenidae